Chamrauli is a village in Fatehabad Block in Agra District of Uttar Pradesh State, India. It belongs to Agra Division . It is located 33 km towards South from District headquarters Agra. 12 km from Fatehabad. 319 km from State capital Lucknow

Chamrauli Pin code is 282001 and postal head office is Agra.

References

Villages in Agra district